Dominic Richard Harrison (born 5 August 1997), known professionally as YUNGBLUD (pronounced "Youngblood"), is an English singer, musician, songwriter and actor. In 2018, he released his first EP, Yungblud, followed shortly after by the album 21st Century Liability. In 2019, he released another EP, The Underrated Youth. His second album, Weird!, was released in late 2020 and peaked at the top of the UK Albums Chart and reached number 75 on the US Billboard 200. His self-titled third studio album was released in September 2022 and also reached number 1 on the UK Album Charts, as well as number 45 on the Billboard 200 and number 7 on the US Top Rock Albums chart.

Early life 
Harrison was born on 5 August 1997, in Doncaster, South Yorkshire, to Samantha and Justin Harrison. He has two younger sisters, Jemima and Isobel.

Harrison was diagnosed with attention deficit hyperactivity disorder (ADHD) at a young age, which made him a troublesome student. He was suspended from Ackworth School after a dare from his friend to "moon" his mathematics teacher. Harrison stated that he was an opinionated child and felt that his energetic nature was often misunderstood.

He studied at Arts Educational Schools, London.

Career 
Before beginning his music career, Harrison was an actor, appearing in the TV series Emmerdale and The Lodge.

2017–2018: Yungblud EP 
On 7 April 2017, Harrison released his first single, "King Charles". On 15 September 2017, he released "I Love You, Will You Marry Me", a song about a dark, modern-day love story.

On 10 November 2017, he released "Tin Pan Boy", a song about the construction project on Tin Pan Alley, a musical hotspot place in London. On 19 January 2018, he released an EP, Yungblud (stylised in all capitals) which includes the three singles from earlier in the year.

2018–2019: 21st Century Liability and The Underrated Youth 

On 19 January 2018, he released "Polygraph Eyes" from the EP, a song about sexual assault against girls. Speaking to Harper's Bazaar, he stated that "it needs to be spoken about from a male perspective, to dilute and smash the shit of this lad mentality that's been so vastly accepted." From 12 to 30 March 2018, he supported K.Flay on her "Everywhere Is Somewhere" tour. On 14 March 2018, he released the music video for "Polygraph Eyes" to YouTube.

On 6 July, Harrison released his first album, 21st Century Liability. In July 2018, he headed to the United States, hitting several tour dates a part of Vans Warped Tour. On 10 August he released an EP, containing seven acoustic versions of songs from 21st Century Liability, called Yungblud (Unplugged). In August 2018, the music video for "Falling Skies" featuring Charlotte Lawrence was released from the season 2 soundtrack of Netflix's series 13 Reasons Why. From 20 September 2018 to 20 April 2019 he toured for his debut album, with Arrested Youth joining his American dates and Carlie Hanson joining the UK and Europe dates.

On 17 January 2019, he released the single "Loner".  On 14 February 2019, he released the single "11 Minutes" with Halsey and Travis Barker along with its music video. Lyrically, the song is about a relationship that fails due to self-sabotage. He released his first live album Yungblud (Live in Atlanta) 22 March 2019.

From 3 May 2019 to 31 August 2019, he embarked on the Don't Wanna Be a Loner tour, including some festival dates. "Parents" was the first single released from The Underrated Youth EP. It was released 24 May 2019 and described by Yungblud as a song about individualism. "I Think I'm Okay" was released by Machine Gun Kelly, Harrison and Travis Barker on 7 June 2019. On 26 July 2019, Yungblud was featured in the soundtrack for Fast & Furious: Hobbs & Shaw with a cover of Jim Croce's "Time in a Bottle". On 29 July 2019, the single "Hope For the Underrated Youth" was premiered on BBC Radio 1 during Annie Mac's Future Sounds as Annie Mac's Hottest Record in the World.

"Original Me" featuring Dan Reynolds from Imagine Dragons was in October 2019. They performed the song live on The Late Show with Stephen Colbert on 23 October. Yungblud's The Underrated Youth EP was released 18 October 2019 after some delays.

Harrison announced on 17 May 2019 he was creating a comic book entitled "Twisted Tales of the Ritalin Club" for release in October 2019. He attended MCM Comic Con on 25 October 2019 to promote the book.

On 31 October 2019, the music video for "Die a Little" from the 13 Reasons Why soundtrack was released. The video was meant to take a stand for mental health awareness.

In an interview with Capital FM, Blackbear revealed that he had a collaboration with Harrison and Marshmello. The collaboration was revealed to be a song called "Tongue Tied" and was announced to be released 13 November. "Tongue Tied" was released 13 November alongside the music video, starring Joey King, on YouTube.

2019–2021: Weird! 
He was nominated for four NME awards: "Best British Solo Act", "Best Music Video" for "Original Me", "Best Solo Act in the World" and "Best Collaboration" also for "Original Me". He won "Best Music Video" for "Original Me". On 4 March 2020, Harrison announced he cancelled his Asia tour due to the COVID-19 pandemic. The Coachella's organisers then announced that they postponed the music festival from April to October also due to the COVID-19 pandemic. After his shows got cancelled, he came up with the Yungblud show, so he could give his fans a concert experience.

On 22 April 2020, he released "Weird!". On 16 July, "Strawberry Lipstick" was released. Weird!, originally set to be released on 13 November 2020, was pushed back to 4 December 2020.

On 9 January 2021, he participated in the online event "A Bowie Celebration: Just for One Day", covering David Bowie's "Life on Mars?". On 18 February 2021, the live cover was chosen as a soundtrack for NASA's Perseverance rover landing on Mars.

2021–present: Yungblud 
On 19 August 2021, he released his single "Fleabag", it charted at number 78 in the UK. In November 2021, it was announced that Yungblud would release his first short film based on his 2020 song "Mars". The film is a collaboration between Mercury Studios and Interscope Films and focuses on one of the singer's fans named Charlie Acaster, who was struggling to convince her parents that she is transgender. On 11 March 2022, Yungblud released his single, "The Funeral", accompanied by the music video, released on YouTube, starring Sharon Osbourne and Ozzy Osbourne. "Memories", featuring American singer Willow, was the second single, released 6 May 2022. The music video for the single was released on YouTube the same day, featuring an appearance from YouTuber and Twitch streamer Valkyrae.

Harrison revealed the cover art and release date for his third studio album on 17 May, during a livestream. "Don't Feel Like Feeling Sad Today" was the third single, released 29 June 2022. "Tissues" was the fourth single, released 30 August 2022, the song notably samples "Close to Me" by the Cure. The third studio album, Yungblud, was released on 2 September 2022.

Activism 
On 24 March 2018, Yungblud attended the March for Our Lives rally, a student-led demonstration rally against gun violence. He live-streamed the event. On 30 May 2020, he attended the George Floyd protests for Black Lives Matter in California. He and Halsey helped give first aid to some of the protesters.

In September 2021, Yungblud was among several singer-songwriters who expressed opposition to the Texas Heartbeat Act that banned abortion in Texas after around six weeks of pregnancy, stating that, "The right to your body is yours and yours alone. It makes me sick and it makes me really disgusted that people sit there and they take away that choice and they take away that right."

On 24 September 2022, during his performance at the Firefly Music Festival in Dover, Delaware, Yungblud spoke about the death of Mahsa Amini and expressed his support for the resulting protests and civil unrest in Iran.

Influences 
Harrison cites rock, pop and hip hop artists such as Arctic Monkeys and Alex Turner, The Beatles, The Cure and Robert Smith, Nirvana, Avril Lavigne, the Clash, Soundgarden, My Chemical Romance, Marilyn Manson, Lady Gaga, Lorde, Post Malone, Kanye West, Eminem, and Katy Perry as influences.

Personal life

Health issues 
In August 2018, YUNGBLUD tweeted that he suffers from insomnia. In February 2020, he spoke to the Evening Standard and said that he had attempted suicide twice after going through a series of positive and negative events in his career.

Relationships and sexuality 
He described himself as sexually fluid in an interview with Attitude in August 2019. In another interview with the magazine in December 2020, he described himself as pansexual and polyamorous.

He was in a relationship with American singer Halsey for several months; she confirmed their break-up in October 2019. Almost a year later, on Jessie Ware's Table Manners podcast, in November 2020, Yungblud said that they broke up because they worked better as friends.

Since July 2021, he has been dating American singer and fashion designer Jesse Jo Stark.

Discography 

 21st Century Liability (2018)
 Weird! (2020)
 Yungblud (2022)

Filmography

Awards and nominations

References

External links 

 

 
1997 births
21st-century English singers
21st-century English LGBT people
English male singers
English rock singers
Interscope Records artists
English LGBT songwriters
English LGBT singers
Living people
Musicians from Yorkshire
People from Doncaster
Pop punk singers
21st-century British male singers
Pansexual musicians
Polyamorous people
Sexually fluid men
British alternative rock musicians
English hip hop musicians